Luke Priddis (born 14 April 1977) is an Australian former professional rugby league footballer. An Australian international and New South Wales State of Origin representative , he played club football in the National Rugby League for the Canberra Raiders, Brisbane Broncos (with whom he won the 2000 NRL Premiership) and Penrith Panthers (with whom he won the 2003 NRL Premiership and Clive Churchill Medal) and, finally, the St. George Illawarra Dragons.

Playing career
A Woden Valley Rams junior, Priddis started his career with the Canberra Raiders, winning the club's rookie of the year award in his debut season. He was selected to represent New South Wales in the Super League Tri-series and also Australia in the post-season Trans-Tasman Super League test match. Having won the 2000 NRL Premiership, the Broncos traveled to England to play against 2000's Super League V Champions, St Helens R.F.C. for the 2001 World Club Challenge, with Priddis playing at hooker in Brisbane's loss. 

Moving to the Penrith Panthers, in the 2003 NRL grand final, Priddis won the Clive Churchill Medal in the 18-6 victory over the Sydney Roosters. He scored one try and set up both other tries for winger Luke Rooney, whilst making 47 tackles. After this match he became the only Panther to have played in two successful Grand Finals, having won with Brisbane in 2000. No hooker had previously won the Clive Churchill Medal since it was instigated in 1986, though one other (Shaun Berrigan, in 2006) has won it since. As 2003 NRL premiers, the Panthers travelled to England to face Super League VIII champions, the Bradford Bulls in the 2004 World Club Challenge.

In 2009, Priddis was re-united with his former coach at the Broncos, Wayne Bennett, after they both transferred to the Dragons.

Despite being advised by Dragons coach Wayne Bennett to retire at the end of the 2009 season, Priddis went on to make his 300th NRL appearance in 2010. While Priddis played a very important role in the team's success after taking over from Nathan Fien, who suffered a broken leg in Round 1 which kept him out most of the season, he did not play in the 2010 NRL Grand Final. By not playing in the Dragons' victorious Grand Final squad, he missed a golden opportunity to have won three Grand Finals at three clubs, a feat not achieved since Glenn Lazarus did so with the Broncos, Canberra Raiders and Melbourne Storm. Priddis retired at the end of the 2010 NRL season.

Representative career
Priddis made his only appearance for Australia in the 2005 ANZAC Test.

References

External links
 Player Details at stateoforigin.com.au
 St George Illawarra Dragons player profile

1977 births
Living people
Australia national rugby league team players
Brisbane Broncos players
Canberra Raiders players
Clive Churchill Medal winners
Country New South Wales Origin rugby league team players
New South Wales Rugby League State of Origin players
Penrith Panthers captains
Penrith Panthers players
Prime Minister's XIII players
Rugby league hookers
Rugby league players from Dubbo
St. George Illawarra Dragons players